The Lollipop Generation is a 2008 Canadian underground experimental film written, produced, and directed by G. B. Jones, whose previous films include The Troublemakers and The Yo-Yo Gang. It premiered as the Gala Feature presentation of the Images Festival in Toronto on April 3, 2008.

Starring Jena von Brücker, the film tells the story of Georgie, a teenager who is forced to run away from home after coming out to her parents, and the homeless queer youth and other people she meets on the streets.

Synopsis
G. B. Jones’ The Lollipop Generation is a film about runaway queer kids, a gang of lollipop-eating social misfits let loose on the streets of Toronto. They stumble into drugs, danger, and prostitution, and inhabit an underground culture infused with a pervasive yet innocent kind of sleaze. Seasoned with a bottom-up punk aesthetic and a good handful of homemade porn, the film presents an altogether refreshing critique of the stultifying norms of convention.

Cast

 Jena von Brücker as Georgie
 Mark Ewert as Rufus
 Jane Danger as Janie
 KC Klass as Peanut
 Vaginal Davis as Beulah Blacktress
 Calvin Johnson as Playground pervert
 Joel Gibb as Retardo
 Jen Smith as Redheaded hopscotch girl
 Johnny Noxzema as Porn director
 Mitchell Watkins as Porn star	
 Rachel Pepper as Rich girl (Peanut's trick)
 Torry Colichio as Metro Theatre girl	
 Becky Palov as Blonde hopscotch girl
 DD Donato as Peanut's boyfriend
 Andrew Cecil as Skateboarding streetkid in washroom
 Paul P. as Washroom boy	
 Scott Treleaven as Washroom boy
 Christy Cameron as Girl in store	
 Anonymous Boy as Hustler in a black leather jacket
 Gary Fembot as New wave hustler
 Ian Philips as Hustler
 Kevin Constrictor as Hustler
 Stevec as Hustler
 Helen Bed as Shop owner
 Clitoris Turner as Shop clerk
 Rick Castro as Photographer
 Ronster as Dumpster diver	
 G. B. Jones as Doorway denizen

Production
The film was made over a period of 15 years, "one Super-8 reel at a time", whenever the director could afford to buy another cartridge of film.  In the end, the Toronto band Kids on TV organized a benefit so that G.B. Jones could finish it.

When asked if the film belonged to the "queer experimental" genre, G. B. Jones replied, "No, no, no. I mean, I think some people don't really get what we're doing, so they try to stick a label on us, to try to define and limit us. Some people call it experimental film, some people call it documentary filmmaking, other people call it “New Queer Cinema.” But we're going beyond the borders they're trying to impose on us. It is an experiment."

Filming
The film was shot on location across Canada and the United States, and features scenes at sites that have since been demolished, such as the Metro Theatre; Riverdale Hospital by architects Howard Chapman and Len Hurst; Adventure playground in Toronto; and Retail Slut in Los Angeles, California.

Reception
The Lollipop Generation was described by the Buenos Aires International Festival of Independent Cinema as, "...a trip through epileptic shots of documentary ugliness that go right to the origins and essence of sexually anarchic cinema...".
 However,  Peter Keough of The Boston Phoenix insists, "There's a fine line between the trash of early John Waters and just plain garbage. G.B. Jones, perhaps to her credit, ignores it completely." Using Canadian pop culture reference points, Toronto's Eye Weekly called it, "Scrappy as hell, yet often charming, it's a lost Degrassi High episode remade as an amateur porn flick and sometimes as sweet as all that candy."

Time Out described the film as serving "a diaristic function, documenting the people the director has met and the cities she travelled to, capturing an entire generation of underground performers." The 23rd Annual London L & G Film Festival catalogue says, "Shot on Super 8 and video, The Lollipop Generation harnesses these tools of the traditional home movie and uses them to make a fucked up family film."

References

Further reading
 
 Liss, Sarah (2 April 2008).  "The Lollipop Generation". Eye Weekly.  Archived from the original on 17 May 2008.

External links
 
 
  The Lollipop Generation trailer

2008 films
2000s avant-garde and experimental films
2008 LGBT-related films
Canadian avant-garde and experimental films
Canadian LGBT-related films
English-language Canadian films
Punk films
Films about runaways
2000s English-language films
2000s Canadian films